Fyllo is a village and a former municipality in the Karditsa regional unit, Thessaly, Greece. Since the 2011 local government reform it is part of the municipality Palamas, of which it is a municipal unit. The municipal unit has an area of 139.155 km2. Population 3,272 (2011). The seat of the municipality was in Itea. Fyllo reflects the name of the ancient city of Phyllos, the site of which is located within the bounds of Fyllo's municipal unit.

References

Populated places in Karditsa (regional unit)

el:Δήμος Παλαμά#Σελλάνων